Dalaguete, officially the Municipality of Dalaguete,  is a 1st class municipality in the province of Cebu, Philippines. According to the 2020 census, it has a population of 74,596 people.

Dalaguete offers one of the trails to Cebu's highest mountain, the Osmeña Peak.

History

The dalakit (Ficus benjamina) tree is the foundation of the origin and name of Dalaguete.
 

They highly consider this tree for their belief that it harbors spirits or diwatas who could impose sickness if maltreated or hand in fortunes and gifts if placated. When fully grown, the intertwining roots are exposed from the earth and form huge caverns that could house several people.

In ancient times, before the coming of the Spaniards, these trees had been used by people as major landmarks. People gathered under the encompassing shades and conduct social and economic activities such as festivities, contest, trading meetings, and other community gatherings. They establish market places under the shades of the dalaket where they sell their products and conduct trade with local roving traders bringing in Chinese and Asiatic goods from the port of Cebu.

The place where the church or the poblacion were laid would have been the site of a communal gathering area for the natives. It was also the abode of a huge dalakit tree which provide shade and shelter while people conduct their activities. "Adto ta mag-abot sa dalakit". "Adto ta magtigom-tigom sa dalakit" [Let us meet at the dalakit]. These and other phrases were common among locals of centuries past when coming up with an agreement to meet or conduct an activity specifically at the site where the dalakit is situated. For several generations in pre-Hispanic Dalaguete, the area has always been unofficially called as dalakit. Its accessibility and its reputation as a communal area for community gathering have prompted the Spanish authorities to construct the church and eventually establish the area as part of an encomienda. From this common ground, and from this tree, begun the conception of a larger town which later come to be known as Dalaguete.

Geography

Land characteristics

 Land Area: 
 Topography: 85% hilly and mountainous with more than 30% slope
 Land Use:
 45% protected area and watersheds
 30% agriculture (prime area for vegetable production in the province)
 6% built-up area (proj. 2010: 6 - 15%)

Climate

Tropical climate prevails year round in Dalaguete. The mountain barangays are cold and Mantalongon is considered the "Little Baguio of Cebu". Humidity is 77%.

Barangays

Dalaguete comprises 33 barangays:

Demographics

Religions

Economy

 Agriculture: farming, fishing
 Products: vegetables, fish
 Cottage industry: blanket & mat weaving, basket making
 Mineral Resources: ice stones, lime red stone, lime pink stones, wood stones, phosphate, coal

Utanon Festival

Dalaguete celebrates its annual town fiesta in honor of its patron saint, San Guillermo, every 9 and 10 February. One of the highlights of the celebration is the street dancing and showdown competition called "Utanon Festival".

Utanon Festival is also a form of thanksgiving for all the blessings and graces the Dalaguetenons have received from San Guillermo and for giving them a place so rich in agriculture and music.  Utanon Festival is a celebration of good harvest through dance and music. The town is known as the "Vegetable Basket of Cebu" and Mantalongon as the "Summer Capital of Cebu".

References

Sources

External links

 [ Philippine Standard Geographic Code]

Municipalities of Cebu